Slippery Falls is a cascade waterfall near Pelverata Falls, Tasmania. There are no tracks leading to the base of the falls, but one can see them from the Pelverata Falls Trail.

External links 
 Photograph of Slippery Falls at LINC Tasmania

Waterfalls of Tasmania